Fritz Koch (born 12 March 1956) is an Austrian former ski jumper. He competed in the Nordic combined event at the 1976 Winter Olympics.

References

External links

1956 births
Living people
Austrian male ski jumpers
Sportspeople from Villach
Austrian male Nordic combined skiers
Olympic Nordic combined skiers of Austria
Nordic combined skiers at the 1976 Winter Olympics